Pakistan competed in Manchester for their ninth Commonwealth Games. It sent mixed teams in Athletics, Badminton, Squash and Table Tennis. All male teams in Boxing, Cycling, Hockey, Judo, Shooting, Weightlifting and Wrestling, and an all female team in Swimming. In total it sent 46 males and five females.
It won its only gold in Boxing, three silvers in Weightlifting and bronze medals in Hockey, Shooting and Wrestling. Finishing 19th overall in the medals table.

Medals

Gold
Boxing:
 Haider Ali Men's Featherweight Division (54kg)

Silver
Weightlifting:
 Muhammad Irfan Men's 69kg Clean and Jerk
 Muhammad Irfan Men's 69 kg Combined
 Muhammad Irfan Men's 69 k Snatch

Bronze
Hockey:
 Pakistan National Field Hockey Team
Shooting:
 Irshad Ali Men's Centre Fire Pistol 
 National Shooting Team Men's Centre Fire Shooting (Team)
Wrestling
 Muhammad Bashir Bhola Men's 96kg

See also
2002 Commonwealth Games results

References

2002
2002 in Pakistani sport
Nations at the 2002 Commonwealth Games